BNSF Railway  is one of the largest  freight railroads in North America. One of seven North American Class I railroads, BNSF has 35,000 employees,  of track in 28 states, and nearly 8,000 locomotives. It has three transcontinental routes that provide rail connections between the western and eastern United States.

The BNSF Railway Company is the principal operating subsidiary of parent company Burlington Northern Santa Fe, LLC. Headquartered in Fort Worth, Texas, the railroad's parent company is a wholly owned subsidiary of Berkshire Hathaway, Inc., of Omaha, Nebraska. The current CEO is Kathryn Farmer.

According to corporate press releases, the BNSF Railway is among the top transporters of intermodal freight in North America. It also hauls bulk cargo, including coal.

The creation of BNSF started with the formation of a holding company on September 22, 1995. This new holding company purchased the Atchison, Topeka and Santa Fe Railway (often called the "Santa Fe") and Burlington Northern Railroad, and formally merged the railways into the Burlington Northern and Santa Fe Railway on December 31, 1996. On January 24, 2005, the railroad's name was officially changed to BNSF Railway Company using the initials of its original name.

On November 3, 2009, Warren Buffett's Berkshire Hathaway announced it would acquire the remaining 77.4 percent of BNSF it did not already own for $100 per share in cash and stock—a deal valued at $44 billion. The company is investing an estimated $34 billion in BNSF and acquiring $10 billion in debt. On February 12, 2010, shareholders of Burlington Northern Santa Fe Corporation voted in favor of the acquisition.

BNSF and its chief competitor, the Union Pacific Railroad, have a duopoly on all transcontinental freight rail lines in the Western, Midwestern and Southern United States and share trackage rights over thousands of miles of track.

History

BNSF's history dates back to 1849, when the Aurora Branch Railroad in Illinois and the Pacific Railroad of Missouri were formed. The Aurora Branch eventually grew into the Chicago, Burlington and Quincy Railroad, (CB&Q), a major component of successor Burlington Northern. A portion of the Pacific Railroad became the St. Louis-San Francisco Railway (Frisco).

The Atchison, Topeka and Santa Fe Railway (ATSF) was chartered in 1859. It built one of the first transcontinental railroads in North America, linking Chicago and Southern California; major branches led to Texas, Denver, and San Francisco. The Interstate Commerce Commission denied a proposed merger with the Southern Pacific Transportation Company in the 1980s.

The Burlington Northern Railroad (BN) was created in 1970 through the consolidation of the Chicago, Burlington and Quincy Railroad, the Great Northern Railway, the Northern Pacific Railway and the Spokane, Portland and Seattle Railway. It absorbed the St. Louis-San Francisco Railway (Frisco) in 1980. Its main lines included Chicago-Seattle with branches to Texas (ex-Burlington) and Birmingham, Alabama (ex-Frisco), and access to the low-sulfur coal of Wyoming's Powder River Basin.

BN-ATSF merger

On June 30, 1994, BN and ATSF announced plans to merge; they were the largest and smallest (by track mileage) of the "Super Seven," the seven largest of the then-twelve U.S. Class I railroads. The long-rumored announcement was delayed by a disagreement over the disposition of Santa Fe Pacific Gold Corporation, a gold mining subsidiary that ATSF agreed to sell to stockholders. This announcement began the next wave of mergers, as the "Super Seven" were merged down to four in the next five years. The Illinois Central Railroad and Kansas City Southern Railway (KCS), two of the five "small" Class Is, announced on July 19 that the former would buy the latter, but this plan was called off on October 25. The Union Pacific Railroad (UP), another major Western system, started a bidding war with BN for control of the SF on October 5. The UP gave up on January 31, 1995, paving the way for the BN-ATSF merger. Subsequently, the UP acquired the Southern Pacific Transportation Company (SP) in 1996, and Eastern U.S. systems CSX Transportation and Norfolk Southern Railway split Conrail in 1999.

On February 7, 1995, BN and ATSF heads Gerald Grinstein and Robert D. Krebs both announced that shareholders had approved the plan, which would save overhead costs and combine BN's coal and ATSF's intermodal strengths. Although the two systems complemented each other with little overlap, in contrast to the Santa Fe-Southern Pacific merger, which failed because it would have eliminated competition in many areas of the Southwest, BN and ATSF came to agreements with most other Class I's to keep them from opposing the merger. UP was satisfied with a single segment of trackage rights from Abilene, Kansas, to Superior, Nebraska, which BN and ATSF had both served. KCS gained haulage rights to several Midwest locations, including Omaha, East St. Louis, and Memphis, in exchange for BNSF getting similar access to New Orleans. SP, initially requesting far-reaching trackage rights throughout the West, soon agreed on a reduced plan, whereby SP acquired trackage rights on ATSF for intermodal and automotive traffic to Chicago, and other trackage rights on ATSF in Kansas, south to Texas, and between Colorado and Texas. In exchange, SP assigned BNSF trackage rights over the former Chicago, Rock Island and Pacific Railroad between El Paso and Topeka and haulage rights to the Mexican border at Eagle Pass, Texas. Regional Toledo, Peoria and Western Railway also obtained trackage rights over BN from Peoria to Galesburg, Illinois, a BN hub where it could interchange with SP (which had rights on BN dating from 1990). The Interstate Commerce Commission (ICC) approved the BNSF merger on July 20, 1995 (with final approval on August 23), less than a month before UP announced on August 3 that it would acquire SP. Parents Burlington Northern Inc. and Santa Fe Pacific Corporation were acquired on September 22, 1995, by the new Burlington Northern Santa Fe Corporation. The merger of the operating companies was held up by issues with unions; ATSF merged on December 31, 1996, into BN, which was renamed the Burlington Northern and Santa Fe Railway Company.

Effect of UP-SP merger
Union Pacific's merger with Southern Pacific further enlarged the combined BNSF network. Unlike BN and ATSF, UP and SP had significant overlap, where the end of competition between the two risked creating a monopoly for freight carriage in much of the West. Significant additions included rights over SP's Central Corridor from Denver via the Moffat Tunnel and Salt Lake City, and over Donner Pass, to the San Francisco Bay Area, with an alternate route through the Feather River Canyon along UP. The ATSF trackage in California's Central Valley was linked to BN's line into Oregon, through trackage rights over UP between Stockton and Keddie and acquisition of UP's section of the "Inside Gateway" to the beginning of BN trackage at Bieber. In Texas, BNSF received rights in several directions from the Houston area: west over UP to San Antonio, with a branch to Waco, and continuing over SP to Eagle Pass (replacing the haulage rights they had just obtained); south over UP to Brownsville; east over SP to New Orleans (including the purchase of this line east of Lake Charles); and northeast over SP to Memphis with a branch on UP to Little Rock. Ownership of a short connection between Waxahachie and Dallas also went from UP to BNSF. UP, in return, got a few short sections of trackage rights over BNSF, mainly connecting the SP at Chemult to the UP at Bend, Oregon, and connecting the SP at Mojave, California with existing UP rights on ATSF at Barstow, California. On April 18, 1996, UP, BNSF, and the Chemical Manufacturers Association entered into an agreement giving BNSF rights over the UP line between Houston and East St. Louis, paralleling the Houston-Memphis SP line, and allowing BNSF to participate in the UP's plan for directional running, in which each line would serve through trains in only one direction. The Surface Transportation Board, successor to the ICC, approved the UP-SP merger on July 3, and UP control of SP took effect on September 11, 1996. BNSF trackage rights operations began on the Central Corridor on October 10, and soon thereafter on other lines.

BNSF continued projects started by its predecessors, most notably BN's work on reopening Stampede Pass. BN had closed Stampede Pass, the Northern Pacific Railway's main line across Washington, in 1984, in favor of the ex-Great Northern Railway's Stevens Pass. BN never abandoned the line and began rehabilitating it in early 1996, and the route reopened in early December, relieving the crowded Stevens Pass. The ex-ATSF main line, now known as the Southern Transcon, has also seen steady work to add tracks, giving BNSF more capacity on this major intermodal route.

Attempted merger with CN
With CN's lines located primarily in Canada and, through subsidiary Illinois Central Railroad, on a north–south corridor near BNSF's eastern edge, the two systems had little overlap. The combination would have benefited both companies by expanding available cash for capacity improvements, and allowing for longer single-system movements. Shippers and the Surface Transportation Board expressed concern and surprise about the timing, since the merger that produced BNSF had been the only one in the 1990s that did not cause severe deterioration in service. The STB imposed on March 17, 2000, a 15-month moratorium (STB Ex Parte No. 582 ) on mergers involving any two Class I railroads, citing widespread opposition not only to the merger but its effects, likely starting the final round of mergers into two big systems. BNSF and CN immediately turned to the U.S. Court of Appeals, which on July 14 ruled that the STB's right to regulate mergers allowed a moratorium, and the two railroads called off the merger. The STB released its final rules (STB Ex Parte No. 582 (Sub-No. 1) ) on June 11, 2001, requiring any new application to merge two Class I railroads, with the exception of smaller Kansas City Southern Railway, to demonstrate that competition would be preserved and address effects of defensive moves by other carriers. No further Class I mergers have taken place until the approval of the merger between Kansas City Southern and Canadian Pacific in March 2023.

Acquisition by Berkshire Hathaway
The Burlington Northern Santa Fe Corporation was incorporated in 1993 to facilitate the merger of Burlington Northern, Incorporated, parent of the Burlington Northern Railroad, and Santa Fe Pacific Corporation, which owned the Atchison, Topeka and Santa Fe Railway (Santa Fe). The corporate merger was consummated on September 22, 1995, at which point shareholders of the previous companies became shareholders of BNSF and the two companies became wholly owned subsidiaries of BNSF. In December 1996, the two holding companies and two railroads were formally merged, and in January 1998 the remaining intermediate holding company was folded into the railroad.

Robert D. Krebs of Santa Fe Pacific was president of BNSF from the merger until 1999, chief executive from the merger until 2000, and chairman from 1997 until 2002. He was succeeded in all three positions by Matthew K. Rose.

On November 3, 2009, Berkshire Hathaway made a $26 billion offer to buy the remaining 77.4% of Burlington Northern Santa Fe Corporation it did not already own, valuing the purchase at $34 billion. The deal, which including Berkshire's previous investment and the assumption of $10 billion in Burlington Northern debt brings the total value to $44 billion. Consummated February 12, 2010, it is the largest acquisition in Berkshire Hathaway's history.

The deal was structured so that the Burlington Northern Santa Fe Corporation would merge with and into R Acquisition Company, LLC, an indirect, wholly owned subsidiary of Berkshire Hathaway. The deal closed on February 12, 2010, and at the same time, the now merged company changed its name to Burlington Northern Santa Fe, LLC that remains an indirect, wholly owned subsidiary of Berkshire Hathaway.

Operations

Markets and services

With BNSF's large system, it hauls many different commodities, most notably coal and grain, as well as intermodal freight.

Predecessor Burlington Northern Railroad (BN) entered Wyoming's low-sulfur coal-rich Powder River Basin in the 1970s through construction of the Powder River Basin Joint Line with Union Pacific Railroad predecessor Chicago and North Western Transportation Company. Coal goes north in unit trains on the three-to-four-track Joint Line to Gillette or south to Orin, where older BN lines and other railroads take it in all directions to coal-burning power plants.

BNSF serves over 1,500 grain elevators, located mostly in the Midwest on former BN lines. Depending on where the markets are, this grain may move in any direction in unit trains, or wait in silos for demand to rise. Most commonly, grain may move west on the Northern Transcon to the Pacific Northwest and its export terminals, or south to ports in Texas and the Gulf of Mexico.

The Atchison, Topeka and Santa Fe Railway's main contribution to BNSF was the Southern Transcon, a fast intermodal corridor connecting Southern California and Chicago. Most traffic is either trailers of trucking companies such as intermodal partner J. B. Hunt, or containers from the Ports of Long Beach and Los Angeles. The latter begins its trip on the triple-track Alameda Corridor, shared with the Union Pacific Railroad, and then follows BNSF rails from downtown Los Angeles. Its route, the Southern Transcon, has been almost completely double-tracked, and triple-tracking has begun in areas such as Cajon Pass.

BNSF transports Boeing 737 fuselages from the Wichita, Kansas plant to Renton, Washington.

Finances

Trackage

The BNSF Railway directly owns and operates track in 28 U.S. states: Alabama, Arizona, Arkansas, California, Colorado, Idaho, Illinois, Iowa, Kansas, Louisiana, Minnesota, Mississippi, Missouri, Montana, Nebraska, Nevada, New Mexico, North Dakota, Oklahoma, Oregon, South Dakota, Tennessee, Texas, Utah, Washington, Wisconsin, and Wyoming.

For administrative purposes, BNSF is divided into two regions and ten operating divisions. The North Region includes the Montana, Northwest, Twin Cities, Heartland and Powder River divisions. The South Region includes the Red River, California, Chicago, Kansas and Southwest divisions. Each division is further divided into subdivisions, which represent segments of track ranging from  mainlines to  branch-lines. The former Texas and Gulf divisions were combined into the Red River Division, and the former Springfield and Nebraska divisions were combined into the Heartland Division, in the spring of 2016.

These rights allow the BNSF to operate its own trains with its own crews on competing railroads' main tracks. BNSF locomotives also occasionally show up on competitors' tracks throughout the United States and Canada by way of leases, mileage equalizations, and other contractual arrangements.

Yards and facilities

BNSF operates various facilities all over the United States, plus a yard in Winnipeg, to support its transportation system. Facilities operated by the railway include yards and terminals throughout its rail network, system locomotive shops to perform locomotive service and maintenance, a centralized operations center for train dispatching and network operations monitoring in Fort Worth, and regional dispatching centers.

BNSF Railway also operates numerous transfer facilities throughout the western United States to facilitate the transfer of intermodal containers, trailers, and other freight traffic. BNSF Railway has direct control over a total of 33 intermodal hubs and 23 automotive distribution facilities.

The BNSF mechanical division operates 13 locomotive maintenance facilities that perform preventive maintenance, repairs and servicing of equipment. The largest of these facilities are located in Alliance, Nebraska and Argentine Yard in Kansas City, Kansas. The mechanical division also controls 46 additional facilities responsible for car maintenance and daily running repairs.

The BNSF system mechanical division, a subset of the mechanical division, operates two maintenance-of-way work equipment shops, responsible for performing repairs and preventive maintenance to BNSF's track and equipment, in Brainerd, Minnesota and Galesburg, Illinois. The system mechanical division also operates the Western Fruit Express Company's refrigerated car repair shop in Spokane, Washington.

On October 1, 2022, BNSF Railway announced plans to construct a $1.5 billion state of the art master planned rail facility in Southern California, the first such facility developed by a Class I railroad. The Barstow International Gateway, encompassing approximately 4,500 acres (1,800 ha, 7.0 sq mi), an integrated rail facility, will be located on the west side of Barstow, California. This new facility, when built, will enable more efficient rail operations from the Port of Los Angeles and Port of Long Beach to trains for transport through the Alameda Corridor onto the BNSF mainline to the new facility, and then move across the nation on the eastbound BNSF route network.

Large freight car hump yards are located throughout the BNSF system.
 Barstow, California – Barstow Yard
 Galesburg, Illinois – Galesburg Yard
 Kansas City, Kansas – Argentine Yard
 Memphis, Tennessee – Tennessee Yard
 Minneapolis, Minnesota – Northtown Yard
 Pasco, Washington – Pasco Yard
 Seattle, Washington – Balmer Yard
 Tulsa, Oklahoma – Cherokee Yard
 Lincoln, Nebraska – Hobson Yard

Location of some intermodal yards:
 Cicero, Illinois – Chicago Cicero
 Chicago, Illinois – Corwith Intermodal Facility
 Commerce, California 
 Edgerton, Kansas – Logistics Park Kansas City

 Elwood, Illinois – Logistics Park Chicago
 Hodgkins, Illinois – Willow Springs Intermodal Facility
 Haslet, Texas – Alliance Yard
 Los Angeles, California – Hobart Yard
 Memphis, Tennessee
 Oakland, California – Oakland International Gateway
 Omaha, Nebraska - Gibson Yard
 Seattle, Washington – Seattle International Gateway (SIG) Intermodal Facility

Routes
 The Northern Transcon runs from Seattle to Chicago. The route is a combination of parts of the old Great Northern, the Northern Pacific, and the Spokane, Portland and Seattle Railway.
 The Southern Transcon runs from Los Angeles to Chicago. The 2006 BNSF Annual Report states: "We also added about 33 miles of second main track on our main line between Chicago and Los Angeles. All but  of this high-volume  route were double track, as of the end of 2006. Last year, we ran 100 trains per day on this expanded main line, compared with 60 per day in 2000." Technically, it is not double tracked in mid-Kansas where two routes are used: Mulvane to Wichita to Newton to Emporia for primarily eastbound traffic; Emporia to El Dorado to Augusta to Mulvane for primarily westbound traffic. BNSF started adding a second main track in Abo Canyon (east of Belen, New Mexico) the largest bottleneck on the Transcon with grading in 2008–2009, bridges in 2010 and signal work in late 2010 or early 2011. Approximately  of rock need to be excavated, mostly by blasting. The 2008 BNSF Annual Report states: "Following completion of the Abo Canyon project scheduled in 2011, our 2,200‑mile [3,540 km] Transcontinental Corridor between Southern California and Chicago will have only about 30 miles [48 km] of single track."
 The Powder River Basin supplies forty percent of the coal in the United States. The 2008 BNSF Annual Report states that the quadruple track project was completed.

Operating divisions
The BNSF system is divided into 13 divisions grouped into three regions. Each division includes numerous subdivisions, normally comprising a single main line and branches. A fourteenth division, Colorado, has been consolidated with the Powder River Division, except for the Casper and Cody Subdivisions, which were transferred to the Montana Division.

Passenger train service

BNSF directly operates the BNSF Railway Line for Metra in Chicago and the Sounder in the Puget Sound Region — using BNSF-supplied crews in addition to running over its rails. The company's network additionally hosts other commuter trains, including: Metrolink in Southern California, and the Northstar Line in Minneapolis.

The line used by New Mexico Rail Runner Express was sold to the state of New Mexico, but BNSF retained all freight rights on the line and operates freight trains as needed.

Metra's cars that were originally purchased by BNSF predecessor Chicago Burlington & Quincy have letterboards above the doors. In about 2011, about 15 of the remaining cars had the original "BURLINGTON" lettering restored, while the rest now read "BNSF RAILWAY". Other Metra cars assigned to BNSF have the current BNSF "swoosh" logo next to the door.

Many Amtrak routes use BNSF rails: the Amtrak Cascades, California Zephyr, Carl Sandburg, Coast Starlight, Empire Builder, Heartland Flyer, Illinois Zephyr, Lincoln Service, Pacific Surfliner, San Joaquin, Southwest Chief, Sunset Limited, and Texas Eagle.

After the 2015 Oxnard train derailment, BNSF loaned 40 of their AC4400CWs to Metrolink while their Rotem cab cars received upgrades. These 40 units were converted to PTC. The locomotives have since been returned after the cab cars went back into service.

Although it does not have a steam program like the Union Pacific, the BNSF has allowed for the Southern Pacific 4449, St. Louis–San Francisco 1522, Santa Fe 3751, Spokane, Portland and Seattle 700 and Milwaukee Road 261 steam locomotives to operate excursions over their rails.

Safety
BNSF has received E.H. Harriman Award for safety multiple times. But a number of accidents and incidents have occurred on the railway since its inception.

As one of the leading supporters of the Operation Lifesaver program to promote safety at railway crossings and rights-of-way, the BNSF Railway, in 2000, established a grade-crossing closure program. This program, in which BNSF works with communities and landowners to identify unnecessary or redundant crossings, has helped close more than 2,900 of BNSF's railway crossings throughout the United States. Due to the program, BNSF has been the industry leader in lowering the number of grade-crossing collisions.

BNSF contracts with News Link, a small business in Lincoln, Nebraska, to publish employee newsletters focused on safety for some of the railroad's divisions and shops. These newsletters vary in length from four to 28 pages, published ranging from monthly to quarterly.

In 2014, the Occupational Safety and Health Administration ordered BNSF to pay over $526,000 to workers who had been terminated in 2010 and 2011 after revealing workplace injuries at the terminal in Havre, Montana, which is in contravention of provisions of the Federal Railroad Safety Act protecting whistleblowers.

In August 2016, a "huge number" of used hypodermic drug needles were found along BNSF railroad bridge in between the University Park and St. Johns neighborhoods of Portland, Oregon that has become an encampment for homeless individuals. According to a conductor quoted by The Oregonian "Pretty much see people down there at all hours of the night. We report them but nobody does anything."

Equipment
According to the 2007 BNSF Annual Report, at the end of 2007 the railway had more than 40,000 employees; 6,400 locomotives (8,359 as of 2018); and 85,338 freight cars (72,369 as of 2018).
 Broken down by specific kind of car, the BNSF owned:
 36,439 covered hoppers
 13,690 gondolas
 11,428 open hoppers
 10,470 flatcars
 7,948 boxcars
 4,196 refrigerated "reefer" cars
 427 tank cars
 416 automobile carriers
 81 private/business cars 
 324 "other" types of cars
 In addition, the railroad also owned:
 3,253 domestic containers 
 11,714 domestic chassis (Swap body) (?)
 4,070 company service vehicles 
 1,200 trailers
 163 commuter passenger cars

At the end of 2007, the average age (from date of manufacture) was 15 years for the BNSF's locomotive fleet and 14 years for the freight car fleet.

On January 24, 2006, BNSF announced a US$2.4 billion program of infrastructure upgrades for 2006. The upgrade program includes: double- and triple-tracking  of track and a second mainline track through New Mexico's Abo Canyon on the former ATSF transcontinental line; expanding the Lincoln, Nebraska, classification yard and double- and triple-tracking  of track in Wyoming's Powder River Basin region; expansions at eight of the railroad's larger intermodal facilities, and extending many sidings and expanding and improving refueling facilities. In making the announcement, BNSF chairman Matthew K. Rose cited improvements in the company's return on invested capital, and expressed hope for continued improvement. In March, 2008, the railroad was completing the triple-tracking of Cajon Pass in California, creating four tracks through the pass—three BNSF (former Santa Fe and newly installed) and one Union Pacific (former Southern Pacific).

Paint schemes
Most of BNSF's high-horsepower road locomotives are painted in "Heritage" schemes – primarily based on BN predecessor Great Northern Railway's colors of Omaha Orange and Pullman Green, with yellow striping and silver underframes. Since 2005, BNSF's locomotives feature black instead of dark green paint.

Many locomotives retain their original paint schemes, but this is gradually changing, as these units are now either being retired, or rebuilt and repainted in the Heritage III and Heritage IV schemes, respectively.

The first locomotive to bear BNSF lettering was BN SD70MAC No. 9647, introduced in late August 1995, just as the Interstate Commerce Commission was approving the merger. VMV Enterprises in Paducah, Kentucky painted it in a one-of-a-kind commemorative scheme, combining Santa Fe's "Warbonnet" with BN's "Executive" colors of dark "Grinstein green" and cream. It was nicknamed the "vomit bonnet" by railfans. "BNSF" replaced "SANTA FE" on the front of the unit, and "Burlington Northern Santa Fe" was painted on the side. The locomotive has since been repainted into the standard Heritage III livery.

By January 1996, BNSF had begun painting locomotives originally ordered for BN and ATSF patched with “BNSF” on the front and sides. Then, in late May, the company introduced a new design on BN SD60M 9297, painted mainly in BN predecessor Great Northern Railway's pre-1967 colors of orange and dark "Pullman green," but also incorporating red and silver, and said to represent all major BN predecessors and Santa Fe. On the front was a new logo, placing "Burlington Northern Santa Fe Railway" in the Santa Fe cross. Some of the striping details were different on each side, and employees voted for the simpler right-side design, which, with some minor changes, became the new scheme, replacing the BN colors. However, president and CEO Robert Krebs said the railroad was big enough for two designs, and Santa Fe's "Warbonnet" (with "BNSF" instead of "Santa Fe" on the front) remained alongside the new Heritage I scheme.

On January 24, 2005, as part of its tenth-anniversary celebration, the Burlington Northern and Santa Fe Railway was renamed BNSF Railway and adopted a new logo. By March, the logo had been applied to the sides and fronts of six ES44DCs, and on April 11, BNSF officially chose the design it had applied to No. 7701. The New Image scheme is also referred to as Heritage III.

Since 2006, BNSF's locomotives designated for yard work or local trains have been painted in the Heritage IV scheme. Somewhat of a simplified form of the Heritage III scheme, Heritage IV is virtually identical to the original Heritage I scheme, with black instead of dark green, and the current BNSF logo.

See also

 BNSF Railway Police, the law enforcement agency responsible for policing BNSF trackage and property
 Burlington Northern Santa Fe Manitoba, a subsidiary of BNSF, located in Winnipeg, Manitoba

Notes

References
 BNSF Railway (January 24, 2005), BNSF Adopts New Corporate and Subsidiary Logos and Changes Name of Railway Subsidiary as Part of Tenth Anniversary Celebration. Retrieved January 25, 2005.
 BNSF Railway (February 9, 2005), Port of Los Angeles begins discussions with BNSF Railway Company on new intermodal facility. Retrieved February 10, 2005.

External links

 
 BNSF Railway SEC Filings

 
Berkshire Hathaway
Companies based in Fort Worth, Texas
Transportation in Fort Worth, Texas
Alabama railroads
Arizona railroads
Arkansas railroads
California railroads
British Columbia railways
Colorado railroads
Idaho railroads
Iowa railroads
Kansas railroads
Kentucky railroads
Louisiana railroads
Manitoba railways
Minnesota railroads
Mississippi railroads
Missouri railroads
Montana railroads
Nebraska railroads
Nevada railroads
New Mexico railroads
North Dakota railroads
Oklahoma railroads
Oregon railroads
South Dakota railroads
Tennessee railroads
Texas railroads
Utah railroads
Washington (state) railroads
Wisconsin railroads
Wyoming railroads
Railroads in the Chicago metropolitan area
Economy of the Western United States
Class I railroads in North America
Railway companies established in 1996
1996 establishments in North America
American companies established in 1996
Illinois railroads